Thory may refer to:

Thory, Somme, a commune in the French region of Picardy
Thory, Yonne, a commune in the French region of Burgundy
Thory or Thori is a cast in Hindu religion in India.

See also

Thony (name)